Kung Fury 2 is a martial arts comedy film  co-written and directed by David Sandberg, based on and serving as a sequel to his 2015 featurette Kung Fury. Starring alongside Sandberg will be Michael Fassbender, Arnold Schwarzenegger, Alexandra Shipp, Ralf Moeller, and Jorma Taccone.

Premise
In 1985, Miami is kept safe under the watchful eye of Kung Fury and his Thundercops, the ultimate police force assembled from across history to defeat the villainous Kung Führer, Adolf Hitler. After the tragic death of a Thundercop sees the group disband, a mysterious villain emerges from the shadows to aid in the Führer's quest to attain the ultimate weapon. Kung Fury must travel through space and time to save his friends, defend the prestigious Miami Kung Fu Academy and defeat evil once and for all.

Cast
 David Sandberg as Kung Fury, a Miami detective who possesses a new and powerful form of kung fu after being struck by lightning and bitten by a cobra, thus becoming "The Chosen One" as foretold by an ancient prophecy
 Michael Fassbender as Colt Magnum, Kung Fury's new partner
 Arnold Schwarzenegger as "The President"
 Ralf Moeller as Thor
 Alexandra Shipp as Rey Porter, a reporter with a complicated relationship to Fury
 Jorma Taccone as Adolf Hitler, a.k.a. "Kung Führer"
 Leopold Nilsson as Hackerman, a computer whiz who can transform into a Hackerbot
 Eleni Young as Barbarianna, a Viking warrior who rides a giant wolf and wields a Minigun
 David Hasselhoff as Hoff 9000 (voice), a member of Fury's team who transforms into a car

Production
Sandberg began to develop a feature-length version of his short film alongside Seth Grahame-Smith and David Katzenberg in 2015, shortly after the release of the short film. In February 2018, the project began coming together, with Sandberg directing and starring in the film. Michael Fassbender, David Hasselhoff, Arnold Schwarzenegger and Ralf Moeller were set to star alongside Sandberg, with filming initially set to begin in the summer in the United States and Europe. In May 2018, Eiza González joined the cast, with the film now titled Kung Fury 2. In July 2019, Gonzalez exited the film, with Alexandra Shipp cast to replace her. Filming began on July 29, 2019, in Bulgaria and Germany. On September 25, it was confirmed that filming had wrapped. In September 2020, post-production was halted over a lawsuit with investors.

References

External links
 

2020s martial arts comedy films
Fictional portrayals of the Miami-Dade Police Department
Films about time travel
Films set in the 1980s
Films set in Miami
Films shot in Bulgaria
Films shot in Germany
Kung fu films
2020s English-language films